Alexander Zverev defeated Nicolás Jarry in the final, 6–3, 3–6, 7–6(10–8) to win the singles tennis title at the 2019 Geneva Open. Zverev saved two championship points en route to the title, in the final-set tiebreak.

Márton Fucsovics was the defending champion, but lost in the second round to Federico Delbonis.

Seeds
The top four seeds receive a bye into the second round.

Draw

Finals

Top half

Bottom half

Qualifying

Seeds

Qualifiers

Qualifying draw

First qualifier

Second qualifier

Third qualifier

Fourth qualifier

References
 Main draw
 Qualifying draw

Singles